Harold Scott Breeden (September 17, 1937 – February 21, 2006) was an American pitcher and pitching coach in professional baseball.

Breeden graduated from Reily High School of Hamilton, Ohio, in 1956 and attended Miami University. He signed with the Brooklyn Dodgers in 1956 and enjoyed his best minor league season in 1958 for the Kokomo Dodgers, winning 17 of 22 decisions (.773) with an earned run average of 2.09. He also pitched a no-hit game that season against the Keokuk Cardinals on May 19. After 2½ seasons at the Triple-A level in the Dodger system, he was traded to the Cincinnati Reds before the  season for infielder Don Zimmer. In 12 minor league seasons (1956–67), Breeden won 102 games and lost 90, with an ERA of 4.02 in 422 career appearances.

Although he never reached Major League Baseball as a player, Breeden spent 14 seasons (1968–81) as the roving minor league pitching instructor for the Cincinnati organization and was the Reds' MLB pitching coach from 1986 to 1989, serving under Pete Rose and Tommy Helms.  He also scouted for the Reds and served as a minor league pitching coach for the Chicago Cubs and Toronto Blue Jays.

Scott Breeden died at age 68 in Temple Terrace, Florida.

References

External links
Baseball Reference

1937 births
2006 deaths
Atlanta Crackers players
Baseball coaches from Ohio
Baseball players from Ohio
Buffalo Bisons (minor league) players
Cincinnati Reds coaches
Cincinnati Reds scouts
Dallas Rangers players
Hornell Dodgers players
Knoxville Smokies players
Kokomo Dodgers players
Major League Baseball pitching coaches
Minor league baseball coaches
Omaha Dodgers players
People from Temple Terrace, Florida
Salt Lake City Bees players
San Diego Padres (minor league) players
Spokane Indians players
Sportspeople from Charlottesville, Virginia
Victoria Rosebuds players